Poplar Springs may refer to:

Poplar Springs, Georgia, an unincorporated community in Catoosa County
Poplar Springs, Maryland, a town in Howard County
Poplar Springs, Stokes County, North Carolina, an unincorporated community
Poplar Springs, Surry County, North Carolina, an unincorporated community
Poplar Springs (Virginia), a historic home in Charles City County

See also
Poplar Spring